Lester Ray Davis (August 13, 1937 – December 19, 2007) was an American football player and coach. He served as the head football coach at California State College at Hayward—now known as California State University, East Bay—from 1966 to 1970 and at New Mexico Highlands University in 1971, compiling a career college football coaching record of 31–28–2. Davis played college football at San Jose State University, earning letters in 1961 and 1962. He came to Cal State Hayward in 1965 as line coach under Darryl Rogers.

Head coaching record

College

References

1937 births
2007 deaths
American football guards
Cal State Hayward Pioneers football coaches
California Golden Bears football coaches
New Mexico Highlands Cowboys football coaches
San Jose State Spartans football coaches
San Jose State Spartans football players
Stanford Cardinal football coaches
High school football coaches in California
People from Clay County, Arkansas
Coaches of American football from Arkansas
Players of American football from Arkansas